Lower Dublin Township, also known as Dublin Township, is a defunct township that was located in Philadelphia County, Pennsylvania. The township ceased to exist and was incorporated into the City of Philadelphia following the passage of the Act of Consolidation, 1854.

History
Commonly called Lower Dublin, a township in the upper part of the county, adjoining Moreland and Byberry Townships on the south, extending southeast nearly in a parallel line to the Poquessing Creek and the Delaware River. Bustleton, Fox Chase and Holmesburg were in this township.

It was originally about five miles at its greatest length and three miles in breadth, with an area of 9,500 acres (38 km2). It was bisected by the Pennypack Creek, known in those days as the Dublin Creek.  This township was formerly called Lower Dublin to distinguish it from another Dublin township, formerly in Philadelphia County, but now in Montgomery County, and there called Upper Dublin. This township was one of the first created in the county, but the date is not known.

In 1853, about half the area of the township was separated out into Delaware Township, which comprised what are now the Torresdale and Holmesburg sections of the city of Philadelphia.

Resources
Chronology of the Political Subdivisions of the County of Philadelphia, 1683-1854
Information courtesy of ushistory.org
Incorporated District, Boroughs, and Townships in the County of Philadelphia, 1854 By Rudolph J. Walther - excerpted from the book at the ushistory.org website

Municipalities in Philadelphia County prior to the Act of Consolidation, 1854
1854 disestablishments in Pennsylvania